Ivanovka is a rural locality (a village) in Bizhbulyaksky Selsoviet, Bizhbulyaksky District, Bashkortostan, Russia. The population was 60 as of 2010. There are 3 streets.

Geography 
Ivanovka is located 9 km northwest of Bizhbulyak (the district's administrative centre) by road. Kalinovka is the nearest rural locality.

References 

Rural localities in Bizhbulyaksky District